Guido Mantega (born 7 April 1949) is an Italian Brazilian economist,  and politician who was Brazil's Finance Minister. Mr Mantega served as Brazil's Finance Minister for more than eight years, being the longest-serving Finance Minister in the history of Brazil.

Life and career
Mantega was born in Genoa, Italy. He graduated in Economics from the School of Economics, Business and Accounting of the University of São Paulo, he holds a Ph.D. in Sociology from the University of São Paulo and is a professor of economics at several leading universities of São Paulo.

He has long been associated with the left wing Workers' Party and was a key member in the successful presidential campaign of the party's founder and leader, Luiz Inácio Lula da Silva. Upon Lula's access to power in 2003, Mantega was appointed Minister of Planning, and later chairman to BNDES (National Bank for Economical and Social Development).

On March 27, 2006 he was named Brazil's Finance Minister, replacing Antonio Palocci, who resigned in the wake of corruption charges. Mr Mantega left office in December 2014, when he was replaced by the Chicago-trained economist Joaquim Levy.

In mid-2013, financial-markets commentator David Marsh wrote:
 Developing-nation economic leaders such as Guido Mantega, Brazil’s outspoken finance minister — who two years ago accused the U.S. of launching “currency wars” through QE and a lower dollar, allegedly to steal a growth advantage —, have had to change their tune.
Marsh's comments came as the Federal Reserve's Ben Bernanke was beginning to explore the end of QE and one impact was a "withdrawal of liquidity" from markets such as Brazil's.

Bibliography

Notes and citations

|-

|-

1949 births
Living people
Italian emigrants to Brazil
Brazilian economists
Workers' Party (Brazil) politicians
University of São Paulo alumni
Finance Ministers of Brazil
Government ministers of Brazil
Brazilian columnists